The Southern Conference Baseball Coach of the Year is a baseball award given to the Southern Conference's most outstanding coach. The award was first given after the 1972 season, but was not awarded in 1973 or 1974.  The Southern Conference began sponsoring baseball in 1947.

Key

Winners

Winners by school

References

Coach Of The Year
NCAA Division I baseball conference coaches of the year